Pedro Justiniano Almeida Gomes (born 18 April 2000) is a professional footballer who plays for Radomiak Radom as a centre-back. Born in Italy, he featured for both his country of birth and Portugal at youth level, before becoming a Guinea-Bissau international in 2022.

Club career
On 11 March 2018, Justiniano made his professional debut with FC Porto B in a 2017–18 LigaPro match against Académico Viseu.

On 10 July 2022, after spending a year with Académica, he moved to Polish side Radomiak Radom on a three-year contract.

References

External links

2000 births
Living people
Sportspeople from Vicenza
Footballers from Veneto
Bissau-Guinean footballers
Guinea-Bissau international footballers
Portuguese footballers
Italian footballers
Italy youth international footballers
Portuguese sportspeople of Bissau-Guinean descent
Italian people of Bissau-Guinean descent
Italian people of Portuguese descent
Association football defenders
Portugal youth international footballers
Liga Portugal 2 players
Ekstraklasa players
FC Porto B players
Associação Académica de Coimbra – O.A.F. players
Radomiak Radom players
Portuguese expatriate footballers
Bissau-Guinean expatriate footballers
Expatriate footballers in Poland
Portuguese expatriate sportspeople in Poland